Adrian Mannarino was the defending champion and successfully defended his title, defeating Nikola Milojević 6–3, 7–5 in the final.

Seeds

Draw

Finals

Top half

Bottom half

References
Main Draw
Qualifying Draw

2017 BNP Paribas de Nouvelle-Calédonie - Singles